Rüdesheimer Kaffee is an alcoholic coffee drink from Rüdesheim am Rhein in Germany invented in 1957 by the German television chef, . It is a popular drink in coffee houses.

Asbach Uralt brandy and sugar cubes are added to a cup. In Rüdesheim, a cup that is specially designed for this beverage is used. The brandy is flambéed and stirred for a minute until the sugar dissolves. Strong coffee is added, followed by a topping of thickly whipped cream sweetened with vanilla sugar. Chocolate flakes are scattered onto the cream as a garnish.

See also 
 Irish coffee
 List of coffee beverages

References

External links 
 Rüdesheimer kaffee 

Alcoholic coffee drinks
Cocktails with brandy
German alcoholic drinks
Hot drinks